The Rajasthan Police  is the law enforcement agency for the state of Rajasthan in India. The Rajasthan Police has its headquarters in Jaipur, the state capital. The motto of the force is "committed to serve".

History 
History of Indian police under British rule is marked by a series of attempts to introduce more advance standards of conduct and integrity and to raise the tone of the force by improving the pay and prospects of its members. The reconstruction of police was a step towards the improvement of the administration of criminal justice in India. Rajasthan was formed by the merger of the erstwhile princely states so there is great demand of good quality security services because previously no United public administration services existed. The security and the police forces of the former princely states varied in composition, functions and administrative procedures. Following the merger, the police forces of the princely states united as of January, 1951.

Recruitment and service 
Recruitment is generally through the Rajasthan Public Service Commission (RPSC), which conducts a state-level examination called Rajasthan Administrative Service/Sub-ordinate Services Exam (RAS). After passing the exam, recruits undergo training at RPA Jaipur and RPTC. They are governed by Rajasthan Service Rules. The nine organisational units are Crime branch, Rajasthan Armed Constabulary (RAC), State Special Branch, Anti Terrorist Squad (ATS), Planning and Welfare, Training, Forensic Science laboratory, Telecommunications and Traffic Police.

As of 2014 the Rajasthan Police employed 82,193 persons.

Insignia of Rajasthan Police (State Police)
Gazetted Officers

Non-gazetted officers

Hierarchy

Officers

 Director General of Police (DGP)
 Additional Director General of Police 
 Inspector General of Police (IGP)
 Deputy Inspector General of Police 
 Senior Superintendent of Police 
 Superintendent of Police (SP)
 Additional Superintendent of Police 
 Assistant SP (IPS) or Deputy SP (RPS)

Sub-ordinates
 Inspector of Police 
 Sub-Inspector of Police 
 Assistant Sub-Inspector of Police 
 Head Constable 
 Senior Constable 
 Constable

Present scenario

The Rajasthan Police is headed by the Director General of Police (DGP). Rajasthan is divided into 2 police commissionerate, 7 police range each headed by an Inspector General of Police (IGP). The state is further divided into 40 districts (including 3 rural districts, 2 city districts in Jaipur City and 2 railway police districts), 171 circles, 709 police stations and 788 out-posts. The force had 889 Inspectors, 3366 Sub-Inspectors, 3902 Asst. Sub-Inspectors, 8867 Head Constables and 52,837 Constables and about 700 Indian Police Service (IPS) and Rajasthan Police Service (RPS) officers.

Rajasthan Armed Constabulary

Soon after independence, the law and order situation along the 1070 km Indo-Pakistani border became a serious problem. Incursions and cattle lifting by Pakistani raiders was a regular feature and it became imperative to put an end to it. In 1949-50, the duty of guarding the border was handed over to the joint forces of the Central Reserve Police and the Provincial Armed Constabulary, which continued until 1952. In 1952, the Government of Rajasthan decided to raise a special force that could not only be deployed along the border but also assist the civil police in combating the dacoity menace. The first headquarters and training centre was established at Bharatpur in 1952 and five battalions received training there. These men, some ex-soldiers drawn from the State forces and some from places outside Rajasthan, were a part of the first 5 battalions of the Rajasthan Armed Constabulary. Each battalion consisted of 6 companies and one company remained at the battalion headquarters. These battalions were then dispatched to the border areas of Sriganganagar, Raisinghnagar, Barmer, and Jaisalmer. One unit was stationed at Ghat Gate, Jaipur to check dacoity. Within a year of its inception, the RAC proved its worth both on the border and within the State by successfully carrying out its various duties.

The members of RAC displayed gallantry and high sense of morale on occasions that required courage, perseverance, and devotion to duty. Its men battled against all odds, combating not only the enemy but also facing the rigours of the desert areas devoid even of the bare necessities of life. The RAC continued as a temporary force until 1958, there after it was made permanent. From that year up to the late 1970s more battalions of RAC were raised as per the situation and the need. India saw two wars with Pakistan and one with China and there was unrest in Jammu and Kashmir, NEFA, as well as Mizoram. RAC battalions were dispatched to these sensitive areas and earned accolades for their courage and efficiency. In 1962, two companies were taken out of each unit and the 6th Battalion was formed. More battalions followed in the subsequent years. Later, seven of these RAC battalions were merged with the Border Security Force and two with the Central Reserve Police Force. Over a period of time, increasing criminal tendencies, subversive political activities, communalism and violence, have all led to the worsening of the law and order situation all over the country. Rajasthan could not remain unaffected.

Hence, the need was felt to create a special task force, familiar with modern techniques necessary to deal effectively with communal disturbances. In 1998, a Special Task Force, along the lines of the Rapid Action Force of C.R.P.F., was formed to maintain peace in the sensitive districts of Rajasthan. These companies are trained and fully equipped to handle riots. The training imparted to the select RAC companies is decided as per requirements. There are 3 companies of RAC, which have drawn expert swimmers from various R.A.C. battalions and are being trained for flood relief work. The 67 years of RAC's existence have been full of legendary stories, of heroic encounters, of gallant men and their dare devilry. One story that is still related with considerable pride is about the unforgettable encounter with dacoits in Thor village of Dholpur - it lasted for 18 hours. The outcome? thirteen dacoits held and no casualties on the RAC side. As on today fifteen battalions of RAC including one special battalion formed by only Ladies Constables Specially trained Unit named Hadi Rani Mahila Battalion and one battalion of MBC are there in the State as Statepara-military force. Out of these 14 battalions of RAC, 11 battalions are deployed in Rajasthan while 3 are in Delhi.

All units
First Battalion – Jodhpur
Second Battalion – Kota
Third Battalion – Bikaner
Fourth Battalion – Jaipur
Fifth Battalion – Jaipur
Sixth Battalion – Dholpur
Seventh Battalion – Bharatpur
Eighth Battalion – Delhi
Ninth Battalion – Tonk
Tenth Battalion – Bikaner
Eleventh Battalion – Delhi
Twelfth Battalion – Delhi
Thirteenth Battalion – Jail Security
Fourteenth Battalion – Bharatpur

See also
 Mewar Bhil Corps

Notes

References

External links
 Rajasthan Police official website
 Rajasthan Police Sub Inspector Exam 2021

 
State law enforcement agencies of India
1951 establishments in Rajasthan
Government agencies established in 1951